Cryphia paulina is a moth of the family Noctuidae. It is found in eastern Arabia, Israel, Jordan and the Sinai in Egypt.

Adults are on wing from April to May. There is probably one generation per year.

The larvae probably feed on lichen.

External links
The Acronictinae, Bryophilinae, Hypenodinae and Hypeninae of Israel

Cryphia
Moths of the Middle East
Moths described in 1892